Frankie Sullivan (born February 1, 1955) is an American guitarist, best known for being a founding member of the rock band Survivor. He has been the only permanent fixture in its lineup since the band's 1977 inception.

Early life 
According to pianist and keyboardist Jimmy Tranchitella of Northlake, Illinois, Sullivan's musical career began in his early teens. He enjoyed sports and started running when he was 17; he became a lifelong runner.

One of his heroes is Muhammad Ali, and he has a framed autograph from the boxer hanging in his home.

Career 
In 1976, Sullivan was a member of the Chicago-based hard rock band Mariah.

In 1978, he partnered with Jim Peterik and the two became a very successful songwriting team. Sullivan was a lead guitar player. Sullivan and Peterik formed the nucleus of the band Survivor and the band immediately began touring, playing concerts in clubs. Sullivan's first hit on the Billboard charts was in 1981 with the song "Poor Man's Son" from the album Premonition.

Along with former bandmate, keyboardist and vocalist Jim Peterik, Sullivan co-wrote all of the group's hits, including "Eye of the Tiger" and "Burning Heart" from the Rocky III and IV movie soundtracks. He credits Sylvester Stallone for giving him the "opportunity of a lifetime" by using his song Eye of the Tiger in the Rocky III movie.

In 1984, Sullivan and the band Survivor had a song on the movie soundtrack for The Karate Kid. The song was The Moment of Truth.

In 1999, Sullivan was featured on the VH1 television show Where are They Now.

Discography

With Survivor 
 Survivor (1979)
 Premonition (1981)
 Eye of the Tiger (1982)
 Caught in the Game (1983)
 Vital Signs (1984)
 When Seconds Count (1986)
 Too Hot to Sleep (1988)
Reach (2006)

Live albums 
Live in Tokyo (1985)
Extended Versions: The Encore Collection (2004)

Compilation albums 
The Very Best of Survivor (1986)
Greatest Hits (1989)
Prime Cuts: The Classic Tracks (1998)
Survivor Special Selection (2000)
Fire in Your Eyes: Greatest Hits (2000)
Ultimate Survivor (2004)
The Best of Survivor (2006)
Playlist: The Very Best of Survivor (2009)
The Essential Survivor (2014)

Unofficial albums 
Fire Makes Steel: The Demos (1996)

References

1953 births
Living people
American rock guitarists
American male guitarists
Lead guitarists
Survivor (band) members
20th-century American guitarists
20th-century American male musicians